Mavial Magadan Airlines was an airline based at Magadan, Russia, operating Tupolev Tu-154 and Ilyushin aircraft. As of the summer of 2006, it was the only airline flying between the Russian Far East and the American state of Alaska.

The airline suspended commercial operations in July 2006 with debts of around $18 million. It has not declared bankruptcy.

Destinations
As of the summer of 2006, Mavial Magadan Airlines operated to the following destinations:

Irkutsk (Irkutsk Airport)
Khabarovsk (Khabarovsk Novy Airport)
Krasnodar (Krasnodar International Airport)
Magadan (Sokol Airport)
Moscow (Domodedovo International Airport)
Novosibirsk (Tolmachevo Airport)
Petropavlovsk (Petropavlovsk-Kamchatsky Airport)
Saint Petersburg (Pulkovo Airport)
Vladivostok (Vladivostok International Airport)
Yekaterinburg (Koltsovo Airport)

Anchorage (Ted Stevens Anchorage International Airport)

Fleet

As of August 2006 the Mavial fleet included:
2 Ilyushin Il-62M
3 Tupolev Tu-154B
2 Tupolev Tu-154M

References

External links

Defunct airlines of Russia
Former Aeroflot divisions
Companies based in Magadan
Airlines established in 1993
Airlines disestablished in 2006